Clitellariinae is a subfamily of flies in the family Stratiomyidae.

Genera
Abasanistus Kertész, 1923
Abavus Enderlein, 1914
Acropeltates Kertész, 1923
Adoxomyia Kertész, 1907
Alopecuroceras Lindner, 1936
Amphilecta Brauer, 1882
Ampsalis Walker, 1859
Anoamyia Lindner, 1935
Auloceromyia Lindner, 1969
Caenocephaloides Strand, 1928
Campeprosopa Macquart, 1850
Chordonota Gerstaecker, 1857
Clitellaria Meigen, 1803
Cyphomyia Wiedemann, 1819
Diaphorostylus Kertész, 1908
Dicyphoma James, 1937
Dieuryneura James, 1937
Ditylometopa Kertész, 1923
Dysbiota Lindner, 1958
Elissoma White, 1916
Eudmeta Wiedemann, 1830
Euryneura Schiner, 1868
Geranopus White, 1916
Grypomyia Kertész, 1923
Homalarthria Lindner, 1933
Labocerina Enderlein, 1914
Lagenosoma Brauer, 1882
Leucoptilum James, 1943
Meringostylus Kertész, 1908
Nigritomyia Bigot, 1877
Octarthria Brauer, 1882
Platopsomyia James, 1937
Progrypomyia Lindner, 1949
Pycnomalla Gerstaecker, 1857
Pycnothorax Kertész, 1923
Ruba Walker, 1859
Syndipnomyia Kertész, 1921

References

External links
 

Stratiomyidae
Taxa named by Friedrich Moritz Brauer
Brachycera subfamilies